Chief Woapalanne (died June 1779) — also known as Chief Bald Eagle (the English translation of his name) — was a Lenape (Delaware) Native American tribal leader of mid-18th century central and western Pennsylvania. In his later years, he was said to have frequently traveled to the distant hunting lands of the Monongahela River watershed.  He belonged to the Munsee (Wolf) subtribe of the Lenape.

Biography
During the American Revolutionary War (1775-1783), Woapalanne led war parties from Bald Eagle's Nest (present day Milesburg, Centre County, Pennsylvania) against white settlements in the West Branch Susquehanna Valley. He reputedly killed James Brady near Williamsport in 1778. He was himself killed in June 1779 by James' elder brother Sam, near Brandy's Bend in present Clarion County, Pennsylvania.

Another, very different, version of Woapalanne's death is described in Alexander Scott Withers' Chronicles of Border Warfare (1831):

The Bald Eagle was an Indian of notoriety, not only among his own nation, but also with the inhabitants of the North Western frontier; with whom he was in the habit of associating and hunting. In one of his visits among them, he was discovered alone by Jacob Scott, William Hacker and Elijah Runner, who, reckless of the consequences murdered him, solely to gratify a most wanton thirst for Indian blood. After the commission of this most outrageous enormity, they seated him in the stern of a canoe, and with a piece of journey-cake thrust into his mouth, set him afloat in the Monongahela. In this situation he was seen descending the river, by several, who supposed him to be as usual, returning from a friendly hunt with the whites in the upper settlements, and who expressed some astonishment that he did not stop to see them. The canoe floating near to the shore below the mouth of George's creek, was observed by a Mrs. Province, who had it brought to the bank, and the friendly, but unfortunate old Indian decently buried.

Legacy
At the entrance of Brandon Park in Williamsport, Pennsylvania is a wooden monument to Woapalanne carved in 1990 by sculptor Peter Wolf Toth.
Namesakes: 
Bald Eagle's Nest (now Milesburg, Pennsylvania)
Bald Eagle Creeks:
Bald Eagle Creek (Little Juniata River), Blair County, Pennsylvania
Bald Eagle Creek (West Branch Susquehanna River), Centre County, Pennsylvania
Bald Eagle Mountain
Bald Eagle State Park, Centre County, Pennsylvania
Bald Eagle Township, Clinton County, Pennsylvania
Bald Eagle Valley, Centre and Clinton Counties, Pennsylvania
Nittany and Bald Eagle Railroad

See also
Woapalanne Lodge

References

External links
Toth sculpture of Woapalanne

Lenape people
Indigenous people of the French and Indian War
Native American leaders
Native American people of the Indian Wars
Native Americans in the American Revolution
1779 deaths
People from Pennsylvania
People of Pennsylvania in the American Revolution
People of colonial Pennsylvania
Year of birth missing
Native American people from Pennsylvania